Bolbena hottentotta, common name hottentot mantis, is a species of praying mantis found in Angola, Kenya, and Namibia. This species has recently been introduced to cultivation but are still very rare and are raised by only a handful of breeders.

See also
List of mantis genera and species

References

Bolbena
Mantodea of Africa
Insects described in 1908